Tirana Year Zero (Tirana, année zéro), is a 2002 Albanian film produced, written and directed by Fatmir Koçi. It tells the story of a young couple in post-communist Albania, at a time when many Albanians left the country in search for a better life abroad.

Plot
The protagonist of the movie is Nik, who lives in the capital of Albania, Tirana, along with his mother and father. He is in love with a beautiful girl named Klara, who wants to move to Paris to be a model. Nik makes his living with an old truck that belonged to his father, who is now sick, and seemingly dying. 

Amidst the criticisms of his mother, the confusion and desperation covering the country, and the desire of his girlfriend to leave, Nik is still unsure whether he wants to leave. The film explores the way Nik handles the events of his life.

Awards
The film appeared in competition at several film festivals, including Venice (2001); Sarlat, Amiens and Strasbourg; Namur, where it received the SACD prize; and Thessaloniki, where it won the first prize, the Golden Alexander.

Cast
Nevin Meçaj as Niku
Ermela Teli as Klara
Rajmonda Bulku as Martha
Robert Ndrenika as Kujtim
Lars Rudolph as Günter
Juli Hajdini as Linda
Laura Pelerins as Virginnie
Behar Mera as Xhafa
Birçe Hasko as Besim
Nigda Dako as Dessi
Vladimir Metani as Vladimir
Artur Gorishti as Tare
Gëzim Rudi as Titi
Monika Lubonja as Nexhi
Tea Pasko as Nexhi's daughter
Marini as Nexhi's son
Blegina Haskaj as Klara's sister
Alfred Muçi as Klara's Sister's husband
Fatos Sela as City Hall official
Shpëtimi as drunk man 1
Muharrem Kurti as drunk man 2
Jorida Meta as Gipsy Girl
Ledio Topalli as square police
Enzo Bianchi as Paolino
Muharrem Hoxha as barber
Harilla Viero as Thoma
Ardita Mullai as Barbie
Lulzim Zeqja as maniac in train

References

External links

Albanian comedy-drama films